Eero Riikonen (30 December 1910, Uusikirkko, date of death unknown) was a Finnish athlete who mainly competed in the 10,000m and the marathon. He won the bronze medal in the 10,000m at the Finnish Championships in Athletics in 1936 and 1938. He then won the inaugural Enschede Marathon in 1947.

Personal Bests

References

External links
 

1910 births
People from Vyborg District
People from Viipuri Province (Grand Duchy of Finland)
Finnish male long-distance runners
Finnish male marathon runners
Year of death missing